The Tesdorpf family is a political and merchant Hanseaten family from Lübeck and Hamburg Germany. The Tesdorpfs were an old Patrician family in Lübeck before  became the mayor of Lübeck in 1715. Peter Hinrich Tesdorpf founded , the first wine trading house in Germany.Carl Tesdorpf is primarily known for making , a French red wine that ages as it is shipped from Bordeaux to Lübeck. The Tesdorpf wine shop was known to supply wine to Germanic and Northern European royalty, as well as Napoleon. The Carl Tesdorpf wine shop is also reported to be the oldest wine shop in Germany.

In 1840, Edward Tesdorpf moved to the island of Lolland in Denmark, where he became a farmer, landowner, and sugar manufacturer.

Germany 
 
 Burkhard Tesdorpf
 Ebba Tesdorpf

Denmark 

 Edward Tesdorpf

 Frederik Tesdorpf

References 

Hanseatic families